= Earl Tilly =

American politician

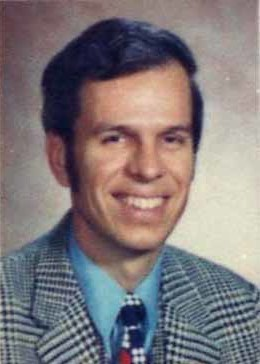
- Tilly in 1977

Member of the Washington House of Representatives for the 12th district
- In office 1973–1986

Personal details
- Born: November 19, 1934 (age 91)
- Party: Republican
- Occupation: businessman

Earl F. Tilly (born November 19, 1934) is an American former politician in the state of Washington. He served the 12th district from 1973 to 1986.
